Sıla Saygı (born 2 January 1996) is a Turkish figure skater. She is a four-time Turkish national champion (2014, 2018–20) and qualified for the free skate at two ISU Championships – the 2010 World Junior Championships, where she finished 14th, and at the 2013 European Championships, where she finished 23rd.

Programs

Competitive highlights 
CS: Challenger Series; JGP: Junior Grand Prix

References

External links 

 
 Sila Saygi at Tracings

1996 births
Turkish female single skaters
Living people
Sportspeople from Ankara
Competitors at the 2017 Winter Universiade